General elections were held to in the Central African Republic on 22 August 1993, with a second round on 19 September 1993. They followed the previous year's elections, the results of which had been voided by the Supreme Court due to irregularities.

The presidential elections were won by Ange-Félix Patassé of the Movement for the Liberation of the Central African People, who defeated Patriotic Front for Progress leader Abel Goumba in the second round. Incumbent president André Kolingba was eliminated in the first round, winning only 12% of the vote. When it became apparent that Kolingba was headed for defeat, he attempted to cling to power by issuing two decrees on 28 August that changed the composition of the Supreme Court and amended the electoral code, which would have allowed the results to be manipulated. However, Kolingba repealed the decrees under heavy pressure from France. The National Assembly election results also saw a victory for the MLPC, which won 34 of the 85 seats, short of a majority. Kolingba's party, the Central African Democratic Rally–the only legally permitted party from 1986 to 1992–finished second, with 13 seats.

When Patassé took office on 22 October, it marked the first—and to date, only—time since the Central African Republic gained independence that an incumbent government peacefully transferred power to the opposition.

Electoral system
The President was elected using the two-round system, with a run-off held after no candidate received a majority of the vote in the first round.

The 85 members of the National Assembly were elected from single-member constituencies, also using the two-round system.

Results

President

National Assembly

References

Central Africa
1993 in the Central African Republic
Elections in the Central African Republic
Presidential elections in the Central African Republic
Election and referendum articles with incomplete results